e-Sampark is a mechanism used by the Government of India to contact citizens electronically and is a part of the Digital India campaign. The name is derived from the Hindi word sampark meaning contact.

The main features are:
sending informational and public service messages via e-mails, SMSs and outbound dialing
usage of the customised user lists
SMSs can be sent via the smartphone application
option to subscribe to the e-Sampark database by individuals, etc.

See also 
Digital India
Digital literacy
National e-Governance Plan

References

External links 
e-Sampark website
Digital India website

Digital India initiatives
E-government in India
Ministry of Communications and Information Technology (India)